Ansar Harvani is an Indian politician. Harwani opposed the partition of India. He was elected to the Lok Sabha, lower house of the Parliament of India from  Fatehpur, Uttar Pradesh as a member of the Indian National Congress.

References

External links
 Official biographical sketch in Parliament of India website

Lok Sabha members from Madhya Pradesh
India MPs 1962–1967
India MPs 1967–1970
Indian National Congress politicians
India MPs 1957–1962
1916 births
1996 deaths
Indian National Congress politicians from Uttar Pradesh